Ilario Aloe (born 10 July 1986) is an Italian footballer who last played for Ribelle.

Career
Ilario Aloe was signed by Inter in 2004 from Varese of Serie C1. He then played two seasons at Inter's Primavera Team. Aloe made his Serie A debut in the last match of 2005/2006 season, against Cagliari Calcio.

In the 2006–07 season, Aloe was on loan to Ravenna Calcio of Serie C1, where he helped the club win promotion to Serie B. Aloe then was joint-owned by the two clubs for €100,000.

On 1 September 2008 Aloe was transferred to Ascoli Calcio 1898 of Serie B. Although only played 13 matches, Ascoli bought the remain registration rights from Inter and extended Aloe's contract from 2010 to June 2013.

In January 2010, after a lack of appearances, he joined Varese on loan, and re-joined former teammate Matteo Momentè. Later, Aloe was sent out on loan to Pro Patria.

On 1 July 2011 Aloe returned to Ascoli but failed to find a club to borrow him. In October, Ascoli offered for Aloe to terminate his contract.

For the next two years, Aloe spent two short stints at Siracusa and Verbano Calcio, before joining Ribelle.

Honours and awards
 Primavera Cup: 2006

References

External links
 Profile at La Gazzetta
 Profile at aic.football.it
 Profile at tuttocalciatori.net

Italian footballers
S.S.D. Varese Calcio players
Inter Milan players
Ravenna F.C. players
Ascoli Calcio 1898 F.C. players
U.S. Siracusa players
Serie A players
Serie B players
Association football midfielders
Sportspeople from Varese
People of Calabrian descent
1986 births
Living people
Footballers from Lombardy